12 Aquarii is a triple star system in the zodiac constellation of Aquarius. 12 Aquarii is the Flamsteed designation. It is visible to the naked eye as a dim star with an apparent visual magnitude of 5.67. Parallax measurements by Hipparcos puts it at a distance of some 500 light-years, or 150 parsecs away. The system is moving further from the Earth with a heliocentric radial velocity of +1.1 km/s.

The brighter member of this duo is a G-type bright giant with a stellar classification of G4 II and 2.6 times the mass of the Sun. Its companion is an early A-type star with double the mass of the Sun.

References

G-type bright giants
K-type giants
A-type main-sequence stars
triple stars
Aquarius (constellation)
Durchmusterung objects
Aquarii, 012
200496 7
103981
8058 9